The Jubilee Medal "40 Years of the Armed Forces of the USSR" was a state military commemorative medal of the Soviet Union established on December 18, 1957 by decree of the Presidium of the Supreme Soviet of the USSR to denote the fortieth anniversary of the creation of the Soviet Armed Forces.   Its statute was later amended by decree of the Presidium of the Supreme Soviet of the USSR of July 18, 1980.

Medal statute 
The Jubilee Medal "40 Years of the Armed Forces of the USSR" was awarded to marshals, generals, admirals, officers and sergeants, petty officers, soldiers and sailors who were members of the Armed Forces of the USSR, of the troops of the Ministry of Internal Affairs or of the Ministry for State Security on 23 February 1958.

The medal was awarded on behalf of the Presidium of the Supreme Soviet of the USSR by commanders of military units, agencies and institutions.

The Jubilee Medal "40 Years of the Armed Forces of the USSR" was worn on the left side of the chest and when in the presence of other medals of the USSR, it was located immediately after the Jubilee Medal "30 Years of the Soviet Army and Navy".  If worn in the presence or Orders or medals of the Russian Federation, the latter have precedence.

Medal description 
The Jubilee Medal "40 Years of the Armed Forces of the USSR" was a 32mm in diameter circular brass medal.  On the obverse, the left profile bust of Lenin over an oak branch going halfway up the left circumference of the medal, and a laurel branch going halfway up the right circumference of the medal; at the point where the two branches intertwine, in relief, the prominent number "40".  On the reverse, the circular relief inscription along the entire medal's circumference "TO COMMEMORATE THE FORTIETH ANNIVERSARY", in the center, the relief inscription in three rows "ARMED FORCES USSR", below the inscription the dates "1918–1958"; below the dates, a small relief five pointed star.

The Jubilee Medal "40 Years of the Armed Forces of the USSR" was secured by a ring through the medal suspension loop to a standard Soviet pentagonal mount covered by a 24mm wide silk moiré grey ribbon with a 2mm red edge stripe on each side and two central 2mm red stripes separated by 2mm.

Recipients (partial list) 

All individuals listed below are recipients of the Jubilee Medal "40 Years of the Armed Forces of the USSR".
 Colonel Yuri Alekseyevich Gagarin
 Captain Vasily Grigoryevich Zaytsev
 Marshal of the Soviet Union and Defence Minister Kliment Yefremovich Voroshilov
 Army General Sagadat Nurmagambetov
 Army General Mikhail Malinin
 Army General Sergei Shtemenko
 Captain 1st grade Ivan Travkin
 Lieutenant General Vasily Badanov
 Colonel General Leonid Sandalov
 Marshal of the Soviet Union Aleksandr Vasilevsky
 Admiral Gordey Ivanovich Levchenko
 Admiral of the Fleet Sergey Georgiyevich Gorshkov
 Rear Admiral Vladimir Konstantinovich Konovalov
 Admiral Arseniy Grigoriyevich Golovko
 Marshal of Aviation Alexander Ivanovich Pokryshkin
 Marshal of the Soviet Union Ivan Stepanovich Konev
 Marshal of the Soviet Union Kirill Afanasievich Meretskov
 Marshal of the Soviet Union Pavel Fyodorovich Batitsky
 Senior Lieutenant Anna Alexandrovna Timofeyeva-Yegorova
 Marshal of Armoured Troops Mikhail Efimovich Katukov

See also 
 Red Army
 Awards and decorations of the Soviet Union

References

External links 
  Legal Library of the USSR

Military awards and decorations of the Soviet Union
Awards established in 1957
1957 establishments in the Soviet Union